Saint-Sixte is a small town in the region of Outaouais, Quebec, Canada. It has a population of under 500. It is internationally known for its old-fashioned sugar shacks.

Demographics

References

External links

Municipalities in Quebec
Incorporated places in Outaouais